A Ninja Pays Half My Rent is a short comedy film by Steven Tsuchida, it was first released in 2003.

Plot
When your roommate dies from an allergic reaction to fruit and the rent is due and you don't have the cash to cover it, there's no time to mess around picking a new roommate. So it goes that our hero in this short comes to share his home with a ninja. Then another ninja wants to be his roommate. Conditions for disaster, fulfilled.

Cast
Timm Sharp - Barry
Shin Koyamada - Black Ninja
Steven K. Tsuchida - Red Ninja
Steve Yager - Running Friend
Anthony Liebetrau - Grapefruit Roommate

Film Festivals and Awards

2003 Sundance Film Festival
2003 HBO US Comedy Arts Festival
2003 South by Southwest Film Festival
2003 New Directors/New Films Festival
2003 Aspen ShortsFest (Special Jury Recognition)
2003 Philadelphia International Film Festival
2003 Boston Independent Film Festival
2003 MVPA Film Festival
2003 Arizona International Film Festival (Best Comedy Short)
2003 Visual Communication Film Festival
2003 Maryland Film Festival
2003 Waterfront Film Festival
2003 Asian Film Festival of Dallas
2003 Lake Placid Film Forum
2003 Fantasy Film Fest – Germany (Bronze Audience Award)
2003 Fantasia Film Fest-Montreal
2003 IFP Los Angeles Film Festival
2003 HypeFest
2003 1 Reel Film Festival – Bumbershoot
2003 Tulsa Overground Film Festival
2003 Mid Coast film & Arts Festival
2003 Sidewalk Moving Picture Festival (Audience Award)
2003 Rehoboth International Film Festival
2003 Calgary International Film Festival
2003 Washington D.C. Asian Film Festival
2003 Cardiff International Film Festival
2003 San Francisco World Film festival
2003 Hamptons International Film Festival
2003 RES Fest
2003 Denver International Film Festival
2003 Edinburgh Film Festival
2003 Stockholm International Film Festival
2003 Hawaii International Film Festival
2003 Deauville Film Festival

References

External links

 Video Link
Director/Steven Tsuchida Website
Shin Koyamada Website

American short films
2003 films
Ninja films
Japan in non-Japanese culture
Films directed by Steven Tsuchida
2000s English-language films